Joseph Vito Marcello De Santis (June 15, 1909 – August 30, 1989) was an American radio, television, movie and theatrical actor and sculptor.

Biography 
Joe De Santis was born Joseph Vito Marcello De Santis to Italian immigrant parents in New York City. His father, Pasquale De Santis, was a tailor from San Pietro Apostolo in Catanzaro, Italy; his mother, Maria Paoli, emigrated from Gioviano in the province of Lucca in Tuscany and worked in a paper flower factory. He worked his way through New York University studying sculpture and drama, his first performances being in Italian.

In 1931, De Santis debuted as a broadcaster on an Italian-language radio station.

After obtaining a part in a play at Hunter College, he secured work as an actor for three seasons with the Walter Hampden Repertory Company, which marked the beginning of his performances in the English language. In the 1930s, when professional acting opportunities became scarce, he worked as an instructor with the Works Progress Administration.

In the era of old-time radio, he was heard on Pepper Young's Family, Mr. District Attorney, The March of Time, Gang Busters, and The Kate Smith Show. One of his most important contributions to the industry was his narration of Norman Corwin's On a Note of Triumph, broadcast nationwide at the conclusion of World War II.

In 1963, De Santis appeared as General Rodello on The Virginian in the episode titled "The Mountain of the Sun." 

On May 17, 1985, De Santis was inducted into the Pacific Pioneer Broadcasters Diamond Circle. During his early years he also did numerous Italian-language broadcasts. He made several contributions to "Remember Radio", a column in one of the trade publications.

With the advent of television, De Santis became known as a skilled character actor who could play convincing dialect characters, mugs, suave heavies and emotional leads. He was active in such early television series as Playhouse 90, Studio One, Sheriff of Cochise, and he appeared regularly on the programs of Red Buttons, Martha Raye and Sid Caesar. In addition to many single performances on other series like Voyage to the Bottom of the Sea, Joe had a recurring presence in such shows as The Untouchables, 77 Sunset Strip, Perry Mason, Mission: Impossible, and in the westerns such as Sugarfoot, Daniel Boone, Gunsmoke, Sara, and Bonanza. De Santis made three guest appearances on Perry Mason; in two of the episodes he played the murder victim: George Castle in the 1958 episode, "The Case of the Long-Legged Models", and Melvin Slater in the 1959 episode, "The Case of the Borrowed Brunette". He was also cast as Louie Parker in the 1965 episode, "The Case of the Deadly Debt".

In 1960, De Santis was cast as Juan Cortilla, a Mexican bandit, in the episode "Chicota Landing" of the NBC western series, Riverboat.

De Santis played in numerous films; the high point of his career came in 1962 with A Cold Wind in August. He was also featured in I Want to Live! and The Brotherhood. De Santis was an active member of the Players' Club in New York City, and the Masquers' Club in Los Angeles, California.

De Santis retired to Provo, Utah in 1978 to be close to family, and resided there until his death in 1989. Along with sculpting, he contributed regularly to the activities of the Provo Eldred Center. He was a heavy smoker for much of his life and suffered from chronic bronchitis and borderline emphysema; he died in 1989 at the age of 80 of chronic obstructive pulmonary disease.

In the liner notes to Frank Zappa's first album, Freak Out!, one finds "These People Have Contributed Materially in Many Ways to Make Our Music What it is. Please Do Not Hold it Against them." De Santis' name is listed along with many others. An explanation for this can be found in an interview with Carl Franzoni, a vocalist for whom the first song on that album, "Hungry Freaks, Daddy" was written. Franzoni and Zappa were acquainted with Vito Paulekas, a sculptor and dancer and the L.A. freak scene guru in the early sixties. Apparently certain movie stars, De Santis included, would come to Vito's studio to sculpt, and somehow something about Joe stuck in Zappa's mind.

Personal life 
In 1935, De Santis married Miriam Moss, an actress; they had one son David and later divorced. In 1949, he married Margaret Draper, also an actress, whom he met while both were playing parts on Pepper Young's Family. They had one son Christopher by this marriage and divorced in 1956, at which time De Santis moved to California to pursue his work in television and films. In 1959, he married Wanda Slye who preceded him in death in 1977.

Sculpture 
De Santis studied at the Leonardo da Vinci Art School and was apprenticed to Onorio Ruotolo at the Beaux Arts Institute of Design, 1927–29. From 1936 to 1940 he taught sculpting at the Henry Street Settlement and the YMHA at 92nd St. in New York City.

According to an article in the New York Post of June 2, 1937, he would gather materials from construction sites – wood, limestone, and whatever he could find – for his pieces and display them at Washington Square.

He was commissioned by the editors of Flying Magazine to create a bust of aviatrix Joan Merriam Smith which was presented to the National Air and Space Museum in 1972.

Filmography

Film

Television

References

External links 

 The Official Joe De Santis tribute page
 
 
 
 New York Times obituary for Joe DeSantis

1909 births
1989 deaths
Male actors from New York City
American male television actors
American male radio actors
American male film actors
American male stage actors
Male actors from Los Angeles
Artists from Provo, Utah
American people of Italian descent
20th-century American male actors
Western (genre) television actors